Yu Ji (29 Jan 17391823) was a Chinese painter, calligrapher, and poet active during the Qing dynasty. A Hangzhou native and a member of the Hanlin Academy, he was known for painting female figures, which earned him the nickname Yu meiren or "Yu, the Painter of Beauties". Yu was also an editor; he contributed to the Siku Quanshu and was the collator of the first printed edition of Liaozhai zhiyi or Strange Tales from a Chinese Studio published in 1766.

References

Citations

Bibliography

 
 

1739 births
1823 deaths
Qing dynasty painters
18th-century Chinese painters
18th-century Chinese poets
People from Hangzhou